Syllepte mimalis is a moth in the family Crambidae. It was described by Cajetan Felder, Rudolf Felder and Alois Friedrich Rogenhofer in 1875. It is found in Guatemala.

References

Moths described in 1875
mimalis
Moths of Central America